Kosmos 1223 ( meaning Cosmos 1223) was a Soviet US-K missile early warning satellite which was launched in 1980 as part of the Soviet military's Oko programme. The satellite was designed to identify missile launches using optical telescopes and infrared sensors.

Kosmos 1223 was launched from Site 41/1 at Plesetsk Cosmodrome in the Russian SSR. A Molniya-M carrier rocket with a 2BL upper stage was used to perform the launch, which took place at 21:37 UTC on 27 November 1980. The launch successfully placed the satellite into a molniya orbit. It subsequently received its Kosmos designation, and the international designator 1980-095A. The United States Space Command assigned it the Satellite Catalog Number 12078.

References

See also
List of Kosmos satellites (1001–1250)
List of R-7 launches (1980-1984)
1980 in spaceflight
List of Oko satellites

Kosmos satellites
1980 in spaceflight
Oko
Spacecraft launched by Molniya-M rockets